Kreeda Bharati is an Indian sports organization formed by Rashtriya Swayamsevak Sangh. In which training of physical and mental sports is given to every citizen of the country, especially the youth. It was established in the year 1992 in Pune, Maharashtra.

Objective 
The main objective of Kreeda Bharati is to promote indigenous sports and traditional games of rural areas along with other established sports of India.

References 

Hindutva
Sangh Parivar